Lake Roxburgh is an artificial lake, created by the Roxburgh Dam, the earliest of the large hydroelectric projects in the southern South Island of New Zealand.

Demographics
Lake Roxburgh Village is described by Statistics New Zealand as a rural settlement. It is part of the much larger Teviot Valley statistical area. 

Lake Roxburgh Village had a population of 81 at the 2018 New Zealand census, an increase of 6 people (8.0%) since the 2013 census, and an increase of 9 people (12.5%) since the 2006 census. There were 36 households. There were 39 males and 42 females, giving a sex ratio of 0.93 males per female. The median age was 59.2 years (compared with 37.4 years nationally), with 6 people (7.4%) aged under 15 years, 15 (18.5%) aged 15 to 29, 33 (40.7%) aged 30 to 64, and 24 (29.6%) aged 65 or older.

Ethnicities were 88.9% European/Pākehā, 18.5% Māori, 7.4% Pacific peoples, and 3.7% Asian (totals add to more than 100% since people could identify with multiple ethnicities).

Although some people objected to giving their religion, 59.3% had no religion, and 37.0% were Christian.

Of those at least 15 years old, 3 (4.0%) people had a bachelor or higher degree, and 24 (32.0%) people had no formal qualifications. The median income was $20,800, compared with $31,800 nationally. The employment status of those at least 15 was that 30 (40.0%) people were employed full-time, 15 (20.0%) were part-time, and 3 (4.0%) were unemployed.

References

Lakes of Otago
Clutha River
Reservoirs in New Zealand